Dock Street Brewing Company is an independent craft brewing company with a 10,500 square foot brewpub and production brewery in the Point Breeze neighborhood of Philadelphia, USA. Established in 1985, it claims to be the first craft brewing company based in the Philadelphia area following Prohibition and one of the first in the country. The name Dock Street was chosen in honor of the seaport district of the same name in Philadelphia which was the largest producer of beer in the then-newly formed country in the late 1700s.

History 
Dock Street was created in 1985 as a bottled beer operation based in Bala Cynwyd, Pennsylvania. It was founded by photographer Rosemarie Certo and her husband Jeffrey Ware, a Philadelphia restaurateur.

In 1989, the pair opened a brewpub in the Logan Square neighborhood of Center City, Philadelphia's central business district. By 1996, the company was producing more than 25,000 barrels of beer and distributing to 24 states, making it the 26th largest microbrewery in the U.S.

Certo and Ware sold the company in 1998 to Poor Henry's Brewery & Restaurant, operated by a descendant of the family behind the Henry F. Ortlieb Brewing Company, also of Philadelphia. In 2000, Poor Henry's ceased operations.

Certo repurchased the brand and bottling operation in 2002. In 2007, the brewery reopened as a pizza-centric brewpub in the former Firehouse Farmers Market in the Cedar Park neighborhood in West Philadelphia. The facility featured a 10-barrel brewing system, four fermenters, and six lagering tanks, and produced about 1,000 barrels per year.

Certo and Ware's daughter, Renata Vesey (Certo-Ware), a graduate of Boston University, and son, Sasha Certo-Ware, a graduate of Franklin & Marshall College, hold leadership roles in the company.

In January 2017, Mark Russell, a graduate from Temple University, assumed the position of Head Brewer.

In April 2017, Dock Street Brewing Company expanded with Dock Street Cannery + Lounge, a mixed-use space with a canning line, two fermenters, and a tasting bar with craft cocktails. With the expansion and the addition of the new fermentation tanks, Dock Street's capacity increased by 225%. In October 2019, Dock Street announced that all beers on tap at this location would be experimental, one-off batches under Dock Street West Lead Brewer Edwin Lopez. In 2017, Philadelphia Magazine awarded Dock Street Cannery "Best New Bar" and in 2019 the Cannery won "Best Intellectual Drunk Fun” for their on-going prose reading series.

In August 2019, Dock Street Brewing Company expanded again with Dock Street South, a 10,500 square foot production brewery and brewpub on Washington Avenue in Point Breeze, Philadelphia, with Mark Russell as Head Brewer. Canning operations were moved to this location as well. Production capacity at this location is 4500 barrels per year.

Dock Street Cannery closed in 2020, and in June 2022, Dock Street announced the closure of Dock Street West after fifteen years in the firehouse. At the same time, Dock Street President and Owner Rosemarie Certo announced the brewing company would be opening a new location in Philadelphia's Fishtown neighborhood by the end of 2022. Details about the newest location have not been revealed yet.

Awards and honors 
Great American Beer Festival 

2021 - Bronze Medal for Dock Street Man Full of Trouble Ale (Brown Porter)

2017 - Bronze Medal for Dock Street Man Full of Trouble Ale (Brown Porter)2012 - Silver Medal for Dock Street La Biere des Amis (Saison)2012 - Bronze Medal for Dock Street ABT 12 (Belgian-style Abbey Ale)1992 - Silver Medal for Dock Street Cream AleBronze Medal for Dock Street Amber Beer

World Beer Cup 

2012 - Bronze Medal for Prisoner of Hell (Belgian Strong Pale Ale)

Pennsylvania Farm Show

2022 - First Place: Dock Street Man Full of Trouble Porter (PORTERS - American or English Styles)

2022 - First Place: Dock Street Rye IPA (SPECIALTY IPA)

2022 - First Place: Dock Street King Juice (IPA >7.5% ABV)

2022 - First Place: Dock Street Winter Haze (PALE ALES)

2021 - First Place: Dock Street Bean 2 Bean Espresso Stout (STOUTS - American or English Styles)

2020 - First Place: Dock Street Man Full of Trouble Porter (PORTERS - American or English Styles)

2020 - Second Place Dock Street Winter Haze (PALE ALES)

2020 - Second Place: Dock Street Wild King (MIXED FERMENTATION SOUR)

New York International Beer Competition

2021 - Silver Medal Winner - Dock Street Man Full of Trouble Porter

The company has also been awarded multiple International Gold Medals for its Amber Beer and Royal Bohemian Pilsner. Dock Street's Rye IPA is currently listed on Beer Advocate's list of Top Rated Rye Beers in the World at #15.

Several of Dock Street's beers were included in beer critic Michael Jackson (writer)'s books, including the 1988 book New World Guide to Beer and the 1998 book Ultimate Beer. The original brewpub was also mentioned in Michael Jackson's Beer Companion in 1993.  Dock Street Bohemian Pilsner was the only Pennsylvania beer included in Jackson's 1988 book New World Guide To Beer, and was among just a handful of Pennsylvania lagers in the Pilsner category a decade later in Jackson's Ultimate Beer, published in 1998. Dock Street's Illuminator Doppelbock and Dock Street Milk Stout were reviewed in his 2000 book Great Beer Guide.

Dock Street Brewery West was named one Philly's Best Pizza Places in 2011 by Philadelphia (magazine) as voted for 'The Best Toppings.' 

In 2015, Dock Street was prominently featured as part of the exhibit "Hucksters: The Tumult of Dock Street" at Philadelphia's Independence Seaport Museum in the museum's Community Gallery exhibit space. The exhibit was curated by documentarian and author Erich Weiss.

Products 

Dock Street currently offers several year-round beers, two bottled beers, several recurring seasonal beers, and many one-off varieties.

Year-round beers
 Dock Street Bohemian Pilsner
Dock Street Golden IPA

Popular Seasonal and occasional beers
 Dock Street Man Full of Trouble
 Dock Street King Juice
 Dock Street Amber Ale
 Dock Street Prince Myshkin Russian Imperial Stout
 Dock Street Winter Haze
 Dock Street Summer Haze
 Dock Street Barracuda
 Dock Street Bubbly Wit

 Dock Street Abbey Single
 Dock Street Abbey Double
 Dock Street ABT 8 (Belgian-style Abbey Dubbel)
 Dock Street ABT 10 (Belgian-style Abbey Tripel)
 Dock Street ABT 12 (Belgian-style Abbey Quadrupel)
 Dock Street Amarillo IPA
 Dock Street Ambitchous Blonde (Blonde Ale)
 Dock Street Aurora Pale Ale
 Dock Street Baltic Porter
 Dock Street Baltic Maple Porter
 Dock Street Barrel-Aged Barley Wine (Barleywine)
 Dock Street Belgian Black IPA
 Dock Street Born Again Tripel
 Dock Street Bubbly Wit
 Dock Street Chamomileon
 Dock Street Chupar un Limon
 Dock Street Cowboy Saison
 Dock Street Cream Ale
 Dock Street Cuckoo's Nest Red
 Dock Street Dark Hoppy Jawn
 Dock Street Devil's Double IPA
 Dock Street Dock Street Beer Ain't Nothin' To Funk With
 Dock Street Docktoberfest
 Dock Street Dude de Garde (Biere de Garde)
 Dock Street Gail's Ale (Belgian-style Ale)
 Dock Street Helles
 Dock Street Hop Angel (Schwarzbier/American IPA)
 Dock Street Illuminator (Doppelbock)
 Dock Street Justin's Moustache (Helles)
 Dock Street Kolsch
 Dock Street No Exit Double IPA
 Dock Street OMG Pale Ale
 Dock Street Pimp My Rye
 Dock Street Prisoner of Hell (Belgian-style Strong Ale)
 Dock Street Royal Bohemian Pilsner
 Dock Street Saison Du Potts (Saison)
 Dock Street Sexual Chocolate (Imperial Stout
 Dock Street Sexy Beast (Chocolate Stout)
 Dock Street Sudan Grass (gluten-free ale made from sorghum)
 Dock Street Summer in Berlin
 Dock Street Teuton Porter
 Dock Street The Great Pumpkin
 Dock Street Trappist IPA
 Dock Street Walker
 West of Center (American Pale Ale)
 Winter Warmer

Experimental Beers 
In 2014, Dock Street Brewery released Dock Street Walker, a beer brewed with roasted goat brains in honor of the AMC television show The Walking Dead, a favorite of then-Head Brewer Justin Low and current Assistant Brewer Sasha Certo-Ware.

In 2015, then-Head Brewer Vince Desrosiers, along with Assistant Brewers Sasha Certo-Ware and Mark Russell, devised Dock Street Beer Ain't Nothin' To Funk With in homage to the hip-hop group Wu Tang Clan. The barrel was fitted with a custom speaker set, build by Certo-Ware, that played the music of Wu Tang Clan on repeat 24/7 for six months. The finished product was served, alongside a control, labeled simply "The Control," to determine whether the music affected the flavor of the beer by agitating the yeast. Bottles of D.S.B.A.N.T.F.W. sold out in under an hour at the brewery and online sales crashed the website. The release party for the beer was attended by Wu Tang Clan member Inspectah Deck.

In 2020, Dock Street partnered with Exyn Technologies on the  World's First Drone-Assisted beer, Dock Street Swarm Intelligence, a Pale Ale brewed with local orange blossom honey, repeatedly hopped with small bursts of Ekuanot and Chinook throughout the boil, and dry hopped with Ekuanot, Mosaic, and Chinook. The can label art for Dock Street Swarm Intelligence is a multispectral photo of the brewery at Dock Street South, shot by "Exyn A3R," one of Exyn's drones.

Partnerships 

Dock Street has been a longtime partner and sponsor of the Philadelphia Film Festival.

In January 2012, the company partnered with the Four Seasons Hotel Philadelphia, its former neighbor, to jointly brew four limited-quantity, seasonal beers for sale in the hotel's Swann Lounge: The Truffled Old Ale, Caliente Golden Ale, Cherry Verbena Saison, and Spanish Fly. In April 2013, the companies renewed their partnership for a second year; O.P. Yum and Crackle and Squeeze are the first two varieties.

The beer they co-brewed, an 8.5% ABV Belgian Ale named the Philly Tripel, was the official brew of Philly Beer Week.

In 2015, Dock Street brewed a batch of Red Owl Ale for the Hotel Monaco, a Philadelphia hotel under the Kimpton Hotels & Restaurants umbrella.

Also in 2015, Dock Street collaborated on the Little Chicken Pale Ale with Philadelphia-based band Flightschool.

In 2016, Dock Street began a collaborative beer with Chill Moody, nicethings IPA, and released the beer in 16oz cans and on draft several times. The beer sold out quickly from the brewpub thanks to fans of Chill Moody and Dock Street coming to buy cases at a time, and limited amounts were allocated to select bars and restaurants in Philadelphia as well.

Also in 2016, Dock Street partnered with DiBruno Brothers on a Truffled Honey Saison in 2016.

In 2018, Dock Street collaborated with Boston-based brewing company Down the Road on a brew named "Down the Street" that featured artwork by Philadelphia artist Alexis Anne Grant. The label had many easter eggs that nodded to each city and the significance of the collaboration, including an eagle in honor of the Philadelphia Eagles, an axolotl, the mascot of Dock Street Brewing Co.'s sister spirits company, Dock Street Spirit's Vicio Mezcal, and a key, the symbol of Janus, the Roman god of beginnings and doorways. The beer was brewed with green tea and honey, a nod to the Boston Tea Party and PA's farming + honey harvesting heritage.

In 2019, Dock Street partnered with ceramic artist Brian Giniewski on a beer named Dock Street Guava Lava, which featured a can label that mirrored Ginieski's trademark "drippy" glaze style.

Around 2019, Dock Street began brewing and canning a custom beer for the prestigious and historic Merion Cricket Club, a private club in Haverford, PA. The beer continues to be produced today and is available exclusively at Merion Cricket Club.

Partnership Beers
 Dock Street Satellite Espresso Stout (Stout with espresso beans, Satellite Cafe in Cedar Park, Philadelphia)
 Dock Street Johnny Berliner (developed in conjunction with Johnny Brenda's in Fishtown, Philadelphia)
 Dock Street La Biere des Amis (Saison; developed in conjunction with Brasserie Thiriez, of the Nord-Pas-de-Calais region of France)
 Dock Street The Truffled Old Ale (English Bitter with winter truffles; Four Seasons Hotel Philadelphia)
 Dock Street Caliente Golden Ale (Belgian Strong Ale with blue agave nectar and chiles; Four Seasons Hotel Philadelphia)
 Dock Street Cherry Verbena Saison (Saison with lemon verbena and cherry puree; Four Seasons Hotel Philadelphia)
 Dock Street Spanglish Fly (Biere de Garde with wormwood, yarrow and ginger; Four Seasons Hotel Philadelphia)
 Dock Street O.P. Yum (Brewed with wheat, oats and pomegranate; Four Seasons Hotel Philadelphia)
 Dock Street Crackle and Squeeze (Saison with Meyer lemons and cracked pink and black pepper; Four Seasons Hotel Philadelphia)
 Dock Street Red Owl Ale (Red Ale; Hotel Monaco)
 Dock Street Philly Tripel (Belgian Ale; Brouwerij Dilewyns)
 Dock Street Little Chicken Pale Ale (Pale Ale; Flightschool)
 Dock Street x Dibruno Truffle Honey Saison (Saison with truffled honey; Di Bruno Brothers)
 Dock Street x Brian Giniewski Guava Lava
 Dock Street x Down the Road Brewing Co. Down the Street 
 Dock Street Sticky Wicket for Merion Cricket Club

Programs and Events 
Dock Street Philly Beer Week Music Fest is held annually on the last Sunday of Philly Beer Week. The concert is usually outdoors, free to the public and highlights local Philadelphia musicians and artists.

Dock Street Philly Beer Week Run is held annually on the last Sunday of Philly Beer Week and coincides with the Dock Street Philly Beer Week Music Fest.

In December 2015, the company began the monthly initiative  "Rare Beer for School Supplies"  as a philanthropic enterprise to collect school supplies and books for West Philadelphia Public schools. Dock Street gives away a glass of a special and rare beer, announced in advance each month, to any adult that brings a donation for the initiative.

Benjamin Franklin Bridge Lighting 
In 1987, Dock Street Brewery was a sponsor for the installation of the Benjamin Franklin Bridge Lighting system  which was designed by the firm Venturi, Rauch and Scott Brown (Robert Venturi). One of the 592 bulbs remains lit in the name of Dock Street Brewery.

Television and Film
In 1993 bottles of Dock Street's Amber Ale were featured in several scenes in the movie Philadelphia.

From 1987-1993, the cast of the U.S. television series Thirtysomething was frequently seen drinking bottles of Dock Street Amber Ale on the show.

On March 28, 2014 the cast of E! News drank and reviewed a bottle of Dock Street Walker on air.

On September 16th, 2016 celebrity chefs Michael Symon, Marc Vetri and Jose Garces, along with singer Nick Lachay, tasted Dock Street Bohemian Pilsner on Symon's show Burgers, Brew and 'Que on the Food Network.

In 2017 (and previously, in 2007), the character Mac in It's Always Sunny in Philadelphia wears a shirt advertising the brewery in a season 3 and season 12 episode.

See also
 Barrel-aged beer
 Beer in the United States
 List of breweries in Pennsylvania

References

External links 
 
 

Beer brewing companies based in Pennsylvania
Companies based in Philadelphia